Katarina Lazić, (Serbian Cyrillic: Катарина Лазић, born May 25, 1980, in Belgrade, SFR Yugoslavia) is a former Yugoslavian and Serbian female basketball player.

See also 
 List of Serbian WNBA players

External links
Profile at fibaeurope.com

1980 births
Living people
Basketball players from Belgrade
Serbian expatriate basketball people in the United States
Serbian women's basketball players
Yugoslav women's basketball players
Shooting guards
ŽKK Crvena zvezda players
New York Liberty players
ŽKK Vršac players
Women's National Basketball Association players from Serbia